The men's pole vault event at the 2004 World Junior Championships in Athletics was held in Grosseto, Italy, at Stadio Olimpico Carlo Zecchini on 15 and 17 July.

Medalists

Results

Final
17 July

Qualifications
15 July

Group A

Group B

Participation
According to an unofficial count, 20 athletes from 15 countries participated in the event.

References

Pole vault
Pole vault at the World Athletics U20 Championships